Ali Reza Tavassoli (1962 – 28 February 2015) was the Afghan commander of the Fatemiyoun Brigade until he was killed in action fighting Jabhat al-Nusra in Daraa, Syria.

Biography 
Ali Reza Tavassoli was born in 1962 in Afghanistan. Tavassoli lived in Mashhad and studied in Qom, Iran. He graduated from Al-Mustafa International University. He was an Afghan volunteer in the Iran–Iraq War.

In Syria 
He was appointed by Qasem Soleimani, Iranian commander of the Quds Force, as commander of Shia volunteers from Afghanistan, Iraq, Pakistan, Lebanon, Syria, and Yemen. On 2014, he organized Afghan Shia volunteers and formed the Fatemiyoun Brigade to protect holy Shia shrines in Syria. In Syria, Tavassoli is known as Abu Hamed.

Death 
On 28 February 2015, Ali Reza Tavassoli was killed in Southern Syria offensive while fighting Jabhat al-Nusra in Daraa, south of Damascus. He was buried in Mashhad.

References 

1962 births
2015 deaths
Afghan Shia Muslims
Syrian war casualties
Military personnel killed in the Syrian civil war